Alexander M. Compton (born March 16, 1974) is a Filipino-born American retired basketball player and coach. He also served as the head coach of the Alaska Aces of the Philippine Basketball Association.

Early life and college career

Born in Makati in the Philippines, Compton and his family spent a year in northeastern Thailand when he was ten years old. His parents, both Southeast Asian Studies scholars, were researchers there.

Compton moved to Madison from upstate New York in 1988, when his parents began working at the University of Wisconsin. He was a starting guard on the 1992 Madison West High School basketball squad. There he helped lead the school's only state championship team since 1945. After high school, he played for St. Joseph's University and Cornell University.

Although Compton dreamed of playing in a foreign league, he had no clue how to get into one until his junior year at Cornell. When a coach heard that he was born in the Philippines, he told Compton that he could play on a team in the Philippine Basketball Association. He found an agent, who arranged for him to join a team in July 1997, after graduation.

Playing career

Compton played four seasons in the defunct Metropolitan Basketball Association with the Manila Metrostars and the Batangas Blades. He won the 1999 MBA Most Valuable Player award when the Metrostars won the national title, and won another championship with the Blades in 2001.

By the time the MBA folded in 2002, Compton was a fixture in Philippine basketball and fully assimilated into the culture. However, he still could not play in the PBA due to the league's eligibility rules, which do not allow naturalized Filipino citizens to play. Instead, he appeared on television as a basketball analyst, but was finally allowed to play for a short period of time for the Welcoat Dragons in the PBA. 

Compton also got an exception from the Philippine Basketball League. He played for the Sunkist-UST Tigers and the Montaña Pawnshop Jewels from 2003 to 2005. He led the Jewels to its only PBL crown in the 2005 PBL Open Championship.

Coaching career

Being an assistant 
In the 2006–07 PBA Philippine Cup, Compton was hired as one of the assistant coaches of the Dragons before being allowed by the PBA to play as the team's second import for the 2007 and 2008 PBA Fiesta Conference, his only PBA appearance as a player. He was elevated to the assistant head coaching position with the Rain or Shine Elasto Painters from 2006 to 2009.

He then moved over to Powerade Tigers as assistant to Bo Perasol until its last conference in 2012.

After the Powerade franchise was sold to GlobalPort, he became an assistant to Luigi Trillo of Alaska. He helped the squad win the 2013 PBA Commissioner's Cup, their 14th title and the first in the post-Tim Cone era. During this time, he also received offers to become the head coach for the Ateneo Blue Eagles and the GlobalPort Batang Pier.

Alaska 
 
Two games into the 2014 PBA Governors' Cup, Compton was appointed the head coach of Alaska Aces, replacing Luigi Trillo. In his first head coaching stint, he led the Aces to the semi-finals, losing to Rain or Shine in full five games.

In the following season, Compton steered the Aces to the 2014–15 Philippine Cup Finals where he went up against Coach Leo Austria, who had been his head coach when they were still with Welcoat. Alaska went on to lose to the San Miguel Beermen in seven hard-fought games. He then got to coach the South All-Stars during the 2015 All-Star Weekend. He also guided the Aces to the 2015 Governors' Cup Finals only to be swept by the Beermen in four games. In a rematch of the previous season's Philippine Cup Finals, the Beermen once again beat the Alaska Aces in 7 games, completing the Beermen's historic comeback from down 0–3 to win the series. Alaska returned to the Finals once again in the 2015 Commissioner's Cup, where they lost 4–2 to Rain or Shine. 

In 2018, Compton led Alaska to another Finals appearance, where they lost to the Magnolia Hotshots. He resigned as coach in 2019 and was replaced by another Alaska franchise legend Jeffrey Cariaso.

National team
In 2015, Compton was invited by Philippines men's national basketball team head coach Tab Baldwin to be one of his coaching staff as assistant coach. He helped the national team to win two silver medals from 2015 William Jones Cup and 2015 FIBA Asia Championship respectively. 

Compton officially returned to the program in 2020. In October of that year, he left the program, returning to the US to be with family.

Career statistics

College

Head coaching record

Professional

Commentary 
Compton started being a color commentator in 2005 for UAAP Basketball coverages of ABS-CBN Sports. After that, he also served as a color commentator for PBA coverages in 2009 for Solar TV and returned to commentary in 2016 PBA Governors' Cup Finals on TV5. In 2019, he was a commentator for PBA Rush.

Personal life

Compton is currently married to a Filipina, model Michelle Astudillo. They have two sons and a daughter.

References

External links
Alex Compton

1974 births
Living people
American men's basketball players
Cornell Big Red men's basketball players
American men's basketball coaches
Rain or Shine Elasto Painters coaches
Philippine Basketball Association imports
Point guards
Rain or Shine Elasto Painters players
Saint Joseph's Hawks men's basketball players
People from Makati
Basketball players from Metro Manila
Madison West High School alumni
American sportspeople of Filipino descent
Powerade Tigers coaches
Alaska Aces (PBA) coaches